Cypriot–Maltese relations are foreign relations between Cyprus and Malta.  The two countries share membership of the European Union, Commonwealth of Nations and historically, the Non-Aligned Movement.  Cyprus is represented to Malta through its accredited embassy in Rome (Italy). Malta is represented to Cyprus through its accredited embassy in Athens (Greece). The political relations are close due to similarities between the 2 countries (on historical, economical and regional). They are the two island countries of the Mediterranean Sea. By May 2004, the two island countries entered the European Union.

History
The Knights of St John had a long history on Cyprus before retreating to Malta, and even then they were a major force in the Mediterranean.

In 2005, Malta's High Commissioner for Cyprus Saviour John Balzan pledged support for the reunification of Cyprus to Cypriot President Tassos Papadopoulos.

The excellent relations between Cyprus and Malta, as well as the need to further promote the two countries’ Mediterranean dimension,  were among the issues that the Minister of Foreign Affairs Markos Kyprianou discussed with the President of Malta Edward Fenech-Adami. Kyprianou was received by the President of Malta in the framework of his visit to the country between 20 and 21 July 2008. It was agreed for the diplomatic services of Malta to share the premises of the Diplomatic Mission of the Republic of Cyprus in Tel Aviv and for a joint Cyprus-Malta diplomatic representation in Ramallah to be established.

Part of the territory of the Republic of Malta & all the territory of the Republic of Cyprus under its control are both part of the Euroregion Euromed. Both countries are members of the Mediterranean Sea Basin Programme & the EU Med Group.

See also 
 Foreign relations of Cyprus
 Foreign relations of Malta
 2004 enlargement of the European Union
 Cyprus and the Non-Aligned Movement
 1988 Non-Aligned Foreign Ministers Conference
Malta and the Non-Aligned Movement
 1984 Mediterranean Non-Aligned Countries Ministerial Meeting
 Neutral and Non-Aligned European States

References

External links 
  List of Treaties between the 2 countries by the Ministry of Foreign Affairs of Cyprus
 EU Facts: Cyprus and Malta on Civitas

 
Malta
Bilateral relations of Malta
Malta
Cyprus